is a current professional basketball assistant coach for Nagasaki Velca in Japan and the former assistant coach for the Melbourne United of the NBL. He is not good at speaking English.

References

External links

1982 births
Living people
Akita Northern Happinets coaches
Alvark Tokyo coaches
Japanese basketball coaches
Melbourne United coaches
Sportspeople from Osaka Prefecture
Waseda University alumni